Evropesma or Europjesma was a pop song contest in Serbia and Montenegro which ran from 2004 to 2006. The winning song represented the country in the Eurovision Song Contest. It was organized by the Serbia and Montenegro union of broadcasters UJRT (consisting of RTS and RTCG).

In 2005 and 2006, Beovizija and Montevizija served as Serbia's and Montenegro's semi-finals for Evropesma (respectively). After the dissolution of the state union between Serbia and Montenegro, the semifinal contests took over the role of this festival.

Voting process
RTCG argued that fairly anonymous representatives from Montenegro have little chance against a number of big music stars that generally take part on behalf of RTS, and who are usually famous in Montenegro itself. RTCG failed to engage any of the big Montenegro stars that could actually gain televotes to take part in Montevizija. Because of this, RTCG demanded that televoting should only be a part of the decision on who is going to win the competition. As a result, there are four judges appointed by RTCG, four by RTS and televoting was the ninth jury member. Points are allocated as follows: 1, 2, 3, 4, 5, 6, 7, 8, 10 or 12 (1, 2, 3, 4, 5, 6, 7, 8, 9 and 10 in 2004).

Winners
2004 Željko Joksimović (won 2nd place in the ESC 2004)
2005 No Name (won 7th place in the ESC 2005)
2006 No Name (disputed by RTS, unverified by UJRT)

2004 event and controversy
The first Evropesma, held February 21, 2004, in Belgrade, Serbia, featured 24 performers, 19 from Serbia and only 5 from Montenegro. Four of the songs that represented RTS were selected in Beovizija 2004, which was in part a semifinal for Evropesma. The representatives for RTCG were selected internally, and the others were selected by UJRT. Željko Joksimović won the 2004 Evropesma with "Lane moje", going on to reach second place in the Eurovision Song Contest 2004 in Istanbul, Turkey. The members of the Serbian jury didn't give a single point to the songs that represented Montenegro and member of Montenegrin jury didn't give points to winner and the runner up of Beovizija, which caused some controversy.

2005 event and controversy

Europjesma 2005 was held on March 4, 2005, in Podgorica, Montenegro. Even before the contest started there were some controversies. RTCG said that RTS was favoring their entrants Ogi Radivojević and Jelena Tomašević, runner up and winner, respectively, of Beovizija 2005. Željko Joksimović, author of the song "Jutro" performed by Jelena Tomašević, even arranged a winning party for Jelena, before the show. RTCG judges voted by awarding few points to any of the Serbian performers, while giving the maximum points the band No Name (who also won the televote).

Before allowing "Zauvijek moja" to be confirmed as Serbia and Montenegro's entry, the EBU launched an investigation into a number of formal complaints, which also related to hotly disputed allegations of plagiarism. However, after prolonged deliberations, the song was given the green light.

There were rumors that the televote, which only lasted for 10 minutes, was free of charge in Montenegro and not in Serbia, but it was proven false.

In the table above, shaded columns correspond to jurors from Montenegro and italicized rows correspond to songs from Serbia. Serbian band Luna initially planned to compete in the final, but the band withdrew just before the event started due to boycott. They were allocated to perform 11th with the song "Sentimientos".

2006 event and controversy
2006 Evropesma, held in Belgrade, Serbia, on March 11, 2006, saw the same voting pattern from the judges from both republics: this year's favorites, once again winners and the runner up of Beovizija 2006, Flamingosi (Serbian-Montenegrin duo) feat.  Louis and Ana Nikolić, respectively, received no points from the RTCG judges. The judges appointed by RTS in turn awarded eight points to  No Name and four points to Stevan Faddy, enough for No Name to score another win. The Beovizija favorites Flamingosi finished second. The televote placed Beovizija favorites first and second and No Name third.

The stir began during the voting, as the audience started leaving the event in the midst of it, after realizing that their favourites were not going to win. The remaining audience booed No Name off the stage, and threw objects (such as bottles) at the stage, as they came out to accept the award and perform their song again, in the Eurovision Song Contest tradition. The audience then wooed Flamingosi on stage and they performed their song with the other finalists from Beovizija present on stage.

As a result, the Executive Board of UJRT did not accept the victory of No Name, stating that voting violated the merits of the competition, albeit not being found irregular. Source: UJRT statement

The Director General of the RTS and the head of UJRT, Aleksandar Tijanić, wrote a letter to his counterpart at the RTCG, Radovan Miljanić, suggesting that a new contest be held, featuring five songs from both semi-finals that got the most points. The winner would be selected solely through televoting. At the same time, RTCG requested from the European Broadcasting Union that they intervene in accepting the voting results from the controversial contest. The European Broadcasting Union responded on March 18, 2006, two days before the deadline for the submission of the national entry to the 2006 Eurovision Song Contest, by suggesting that the broadcasters find a solution on their own. This was to no avail, and finally, on March 20, 2006, Serbia and Montenegro officially withdrew from the 2006 Eurovision Song Contest. As the UJRT broadcast the semifinal and final, the viewers were able to vote.

As the withdrawal left an empty slot in the final, Croatia and their representative Severina took it. The 2005 Eurovision Song Contest Croatian representative Boris Novković won 11th place, one place below the cutoff for the direct entry into the final.

In this table, red color denotes songs and jurors from Montenegro, blue those from Serbia.

See also
 Serbia and Montenegro in the Eurovision Song Contest

References

External links
BBC News: Serbia and Montenegro pulls pop entry
Radio Television of Serbia Eurovision Page
Radio Television of Montenegro Eurovision Page

Eurovision Song Contest selection events
Serbia in the Eurovision Song Contest
Montenegro in the Eurovision Song Contest
Serbia and Montenegro in the Eurovision Song Contest
Music festivals in Serbia
Recurring events disestablished in 2006
2004 establishments in Serbia and Montenegro
Music festivals established in 2004
Pop music festivals
Rock festivals in Serbia